Hatun Ukru (Quechua hatun big, ukru hole, pit, hollow, "big hollow", Hispanicized and broken name Jatunucero) is a  mountain in the Andes of Peru. It is located in the Pasco Region, Pasco Province, Ticlacayan District, northwest of the Waqurunchu mountain range.

References

Mountains of Peru
Mountains of Pasco Region